Novourtayevo (Yañı Urtay) is a rural locality (a village) in Starobaishevsky Selsoviet, Dyurtyulinsky District, Bashkortostan, Russia. The population was 136 as of 2010. There is 1 street.

Geography 
Novourtayevo is located 35 km southeast of Dyurtyuli (the district's administrative centre) by road. Alexandrovka is the nearest rural locality.

References 

Rural localities in Dyurtyulinsky District